Steven James Yeager (born 1978) is an American politician and attorney serving as a member of the Nevada Assembly. He represents the 9th district, which covers parts of the southwestern Las Vegas Valley.

Early life and education
Yeager was born in Brooklyn Center, Minnesota in 1978, the second of three children. He graduated from the University of Michigan and then from Cornell Law School.

Career 
He practiced law in Phoenix, Arizona before moving to Nevada where he has served as a chief deputy public defender of Clark County since 2009.

Yeager ran for the Assembly in 2014. He won the Democratic primary but was defeated in the general election by Republican David M. Gardner.

Yeager again ran against Gardner in 2016. That time, he was successful, receiving 55% of the vote.

Personal life
Yeager comes from a family of public service: he is married to Hearing Master Bita Yeager, his oldest brother, Charles, is a retired Major in the United States Marine Corps. His younger brother, Brian, is a police detective in Michigan.

Political positions
Yeager supports increased background checks for gun purchases and also supports the legalization of marijuana.

Electoral history

References

External links
 
 Campaign website
 Legislative website

|-

1978 births
21st-century American politicians
Arizona lawyers
Cornell Law School alumni
Living people
Democratic Party members of the Nevada Assembly
Nevada lawyers
People from Brooklyn Center, Minnesota
Politicians from Las Vegas
Politicians from Phoenix, Arizona
Public defenders
University of Michigan alumni